Ilmar Laaban, (11 December 1921, Tallinn, Estonia – 29 November 2000, Stockholm) was an Estonian poet and literary critic.

Early life and education
Laaban attended the first Tallinn Boys' Gymnasium from 1934 to 1940. In 1939–1940 and 1941–1942 he studied composition and piano at the Tallinn Conservatory. In 1940–1943 Laaban studied Romance languages at the University of Tartu. In 1943, he went to Sweden, fleeing the Occupation of the Baltic states, and continued studying Romance languages and philosophy (1943–1949).

Career 
Laaban worked as a lecturer in Stockholm University and was a member of International Association of Art Critics.

Laaban mainly wrote surrealistic poetry and was one of the first poets in Estonia to practice that genre. He has written essays and articles on art and literature. Also, he has translated many Estonian poet's works to Swedish (examples: Artur Alliksaar, Betti Alver, Jaan Kaplinski, Viivi Luik, Paul-Eerik Rummo) and German (examples: Juhan Liiv, Gustav Suits, Jaan Oks, Henrik Visnapuu, Marie Under). He has also written critiques and literary works of artists such as Frederic Iriarte, Endre Nemes, Franco Leidi, Rafael Bellange, Lech Rzewuski and others.

Works
"Ankruketi lõpp on laulu algus" (1946)
"Rroosi Selaviste" (1957)
"Oma luulet ja võõrast" (1990)
"Marsyase nahk" (1997)
"Magneetiline jõgi" (2001)
"Sõnade sülemid ja sülemite süsteemid" (2004)

Art critic

References
 

Estonian male poets
1921 births
2000 deaths
Estonian translators
Translators to Swedish
Estonian emigrants to Sweden
Estonian World War II refugees
Writers from Tallinn
20th-century translators
20th-century Estonian poets
20th-century male writers